Diamilette Quiles Alicea (born September 26, 1985) is a Puerto Rican baseball player.

Quiles had previously played for ten years in Puerto Rico's women's league, winning nine titles with the Arecibo Wolves, and led the league in the 2018–2019 season with a .611 batting average.

References

Further reading
 
 

Puerto Rican baseball players
American female baseball players
1985 births
Living people